Carminowe is a surname of Anglo-Cornish origin, which can also be spelled Carminow. Notable people with the surname include:

John Carminow or Carminowe (c. 1516 – 1592), courtier
Nicholas Carminow or Carminowe (c. 1519 – 1569), MP
Oliver Carminow or Carminowe (died 1597), MP

Anglo-Cornish surnames